Eglinton West is a subway station on Line 1 Yonge–University in Toronto, Ontario, Canada. It is located in the median of Allen Road on the north side of Eglinton Avenue West.

Line 5 Eglinton will also serve Eglinton West station upon its completion, scheduled for 2023. At that time, Eglinton West will become an interchange station and be renamed Cedarvale.

History

In 1978 when the station opened, a trolley bus route (63 Ossington) served the station and looped around the station building. To coincide with the station opening, the route was extended from its prior terminus at Oakwood Avenue and Eglinton Avenue. The route ran south to the loop at King Street. In 1992, the route was converted to diesel buses and the overhead wires were removed.

Eglinton West had been planned to be an interchange station as part of the proposed Eglinton West line (not to be confused with the Eglinton Crosstown line). This was one of the three proposed subway lines in the Network 2011 Plan created in 1985 by the Toronto Transit Commission. The project was cancelled in 1995 after the election of a Progressive Conservative government led by Mike Harris. Afterwards, the small amount of tunnel that had been dug under the station was refilled.

Since October 2005, the station has been wheelchair-accessible.

In December 2012, commuter parking lots formerly located east and west of the station building on the north side of Eglinton Avenue were taken out of service, leaving no immediately adjacent parking. The lots were used as staging areas for the tunnel boring machines (TBMs) during the construction of Line 5 Eglinton. On the weekend of 18 and 19 April 2015, the TBMs Dennis and Lea were extracted from the east-side staging area and then transported on a heavy truck trailer to relaunch from the west-side staging area. The two staging areas will each be the location of a new station entrance.

Description
The station building is located on the north side of Eglinton Avenue West between the entry/exit ramps for Allen Road. The station currently has two levels: street level and the platform level for Line 1 trains. The station's pedestrian entrance, the station concourse and a bus terminal are all located at street level. The bus terminal, located in a fare-paid area, surrounds the concourse area with bays on three of its four sides.

After the opening of Line 5 Eglinton in 2023, Eglinton West will have two more station entrances: one just east of the Allen Road entry ramp, and the other just west of the Allen Road exit ramp. The current entrances, which will be retained for direct access to the bus terminal for walk-in patrons not riding the subway or LRT, and the new entrances will all be on the north side of Eglinton Avenue. On the south side of Eglinton Avenue just west of Everden Road, there is a possibility of an emergency exit or a fourth entrance to be incorporated into some future private development.

The Line 5 tunnel and platform will pass under the Line 1 platforms. Above the Line 5 platform level, there will be a new underground concourse divided in two sections by a gap where the Line 1 tracks cross. Crossover tracks to reverse Line 5 trains will be located just east of the Line 5 platforms.

Architecture
The station was designed by Arthur Erickson and Clifford & Lawrie. The main ticketing and concourse area at surface level is sheltered by an exposed concrete space frame supported by eight circular columns. The concrete ceiling is, in effect, a large slab, and overhangs the entrance. With a glass curtain wall, it appears to float. Inside, it is coffered throughout the station, with skylights in certain areas, allowing for increased penetration of natural light. Eglinton West makes use of sandblasted concrete and brick wall finishes extensively, distinguishing it from most stations on Line 1 and Line 2 Bloor–Danforth, where tiles are predominant.

As the north end of the station is in Allen Road's median, the Line 1 platform level is partly built at surface level. Designers took advantage of this and added windows at platform level. The northbound platform has regular windows, allowing for a view onto Allen Road, while windows on the opposite platform are frosted. This combination of window treatments allows transit riders to view cars speeding onto Allen Road's northbound expressway lanes, while blocking views of cars stuck in traffic approaching Eglinton, where the expressway—originally planned to continue south to downtown—ends.

During July 2009, the TTC installed an $850,000 green roof over the northern end of the station to reduce maintenance costs, increase the lifespan to 40–50 years, reduce the heat island effect by lowering the temperature of the surrounding area by a few degrees, and to reduce runoff. The TTC had to repair the roof anyway, since it had been leaking since 2000. The plants atop the 835-square-metre roof are low-maintenance sedums.  and  stations are slated to have green roofs installed as well.

Art

The station's artwork, on two enamel murals facing each other, is Summertime Streetcar by Gerald Zeldin, is a montage of PCC streetcars from differing perspectives. The artwork is two storeys high and is located in the appropriately high ceiling section of the platform level.

In future, as part of a program to install artworks at major interchange stations along Line 5 Eglinton, the station will feature the artwork Super Signals by Douglas Coupland consisting of aluminum panels with brightly coloured concentric circles against a background of black and white diagonal lines. The artwork is an exaggeration of traditional wayfinding graphics.

Line 1 infrastructure in the vicinity
South of the station, Line 1 continues underground below Everden Road to reach the Cedarvale Ravine, then continues southeast below the ravine. Moving northward, tracks continue on the surface, in the median of Allen Road.

Nearby landmarks
Nearby landmarks include the York–Eglinton BIA, Little Jamaica, and the Oakwood-Vaughan and Humewood-Cedarvale neighbourhoods.

Surface connections

When the subway is closed, buses do not enter the station, but will service nearby stops. TTC routes serving the station include:

See also
Toronto Transit Commission
Eglinton West subway

References

External links

Line 1 Yonge–University stations
Line 5 Eglinton stations
Railway stations in Canada opened in 1978
Arthur Erickson buildings
Railway stations in highway medians